Kwe Te No is a Burmese politician  who currently serves as a Chin State Hluttaw MP for Hpasawng Township  No.1. He is a member of the National League for Democracy.

Political career
He is a member of the National League for Democracy. In the 2020 Myanmar general election, he was elected as an Chin State Hluttaw MP, and elected representative from  Hpasawng Township  No.1parliamentary constituency.

References

1959 births
Living people
Burmese politicians